What the Dub? is a 2021 multiplayer party game developed and published by Wide Right Interactive. It was released on April 8, 2021, to positive reviews.

A follow up, RiffTrax: The Game, based on and featuring cast members from RiffTrax, was released in May 2022.

Gameplay
Gameplay consists of players writing their own lines of dialogue for clips from public domain B movies, PSAs and industrial films. After the line is played back using text-to-speech, the players then choose which line is the best. Between two to six players can play in a game, and up to twelve audience members can watch and vote on the best lines per game.

Notable films used on the game
Night of the Living Dead (1968)
Teenagers from Outer Space (1959)
Cheating (1952)
The Brain That Wouldn't Die (1962)
The Terror (1963)
House on Haunted Hill (1959)
Scarlett Street (1945)
The City of the Dead (1960)
The Little Shop of Horrors (1960)
McClintock (1963)
Young Man's Fancy (1952)
The Red House (1947)
 The Great Rights (1963)
Stop Driving Us Crazy (1961)
Killers From Space (1954)
A Date with Your Family (1950)
Horror Express (1972)
Cosmos: War of the Planets (1977)
Duck and Cover (1951)
Dating: Do's and Don't's (1949)
Dressed to Kill (1946)

See also
Mystery Science Theater 3000
List of films in the public domain
Cult film

References

External links
 Official website

2021 video games
Indie video games
Nintendo Switch games
Party video games
PlayStation 4 games
Video games developed in the United States
Windows games
Works about films
Xbox One games
Self-reflexive video games
Multiplayer video games